Jochem van der Hoeven (born 5 October 1975) is a Dutch former footballer who played as a defender or midfielder.

Career

Van der Hoeven started his career with Dutch side Sparta (Rotterdam), where he made 32 league appearances and scored 3 goals. On 1 December 1995, van der Hoeven debuted for Sparta (Rotterdam) during a 2–1 win over PSV. On 8 March 1996, he scored his first goal for Sparta (Rotterdam) during a 5–2 win over Heerenveen. > In 2004, van der Hoeven signed for AEP in the Cypriot top flight. In 2005, he signed for Dutch ninth tier club .

References

External links
 

1960 births
AEP Paphos FC players
Association football defenders
Association football midfielders
Cypriot First Division players
Dutch expatriate footballers
Dutch expatriate sportspeople in Cyprus
Dutch footballers
Eerste Divisie players
Eredivisie players
Expatriate footballers in Cyprus
Fortuna Sittard players
Helmond Sport players
Living people
SBV Vitesse players
Sparta Rotterdam players
Footballers from Rotterdam